Arthur Fitzwilliam Tait (February 5, 1819April 28, 1905) was a British-American artist who is known mostly for his paintings of wildlife. During most of his career, he was associated with the New York City art scene.

Life and career

Tait was born in Livesey Hall near Liverpool, England. 
At eight years old, because his father went bankrupt he was sent to live with relatives in Lancaster. It is during that time that he became attached to animals. Later on, in Manchester, England, Agnew & Zanetti Repository of Art acquired Arthur Tait who began self-learning to paint, as a twelve-year-old boy. His work consisted mostly of reproduced lithography that were exposed for Agnew's exhibitions. In 1838, he left the Agnew lithography reproduction business to marry.
 During the period 1845-1848 he produced a number of lithographs of railway subjects with a particular focus on landscapes showing Lancashire and Yorkshire lines.
During the late 1840s he became aware of the Americas while attending a George Catlin exhibition in Paris. He immigrated to the United States in 1850, where he established a small painting camp in the Adirondacks to paint during summer. Starting in 1852, Currier & Ives reproduced lithographs of his works to publicize him. What also promoted his talent was exhibitions held at the National Academy of Design, New York during the late 19th century showing more than 200 paintings of his. 
In 1858 he was elected to full membership of the Academy.

 
He was identified with the art life of New York until his death at Yonkers, New York in 1905. He painted barnyard fowl and wild birds as well as sheep and deer, with great dexterity, and reproductions of his minute panels of chickens had an enormous vogue.

In 2006, Tait's painting Good Hunting Ground: The Home of the Deer was auctioned for $167,300.

He is interred at Woodlawn Cemetery in the Bronx, New York City.

References

External links
 Arthur Tait Artwork Examples on AskART.
 Bedford Fine Art Gallery: Artwork by Arthur Fitzwilliam Tait

1819 births
1905 deaths
19th-century American painters
American male painters
20th-century American painters
Animal artists
National Academy of Design members
19th-century American male artists
Burials at Woodlawn Cemetery (Bronx, New York)
20th-century American male artists